The 1995 Canoe Marathon European Championships were the first edition of the Canoe Marathon European Championships, which took place on 20–21 May 1995 in Murcia, Spain. The races were held in the Mar Menor lagoon, near Los Alcázares. 
The competition consisted of five events, four in kayak (men and women's K-1 and K-2) and one in canoe (men's C-1), all of which were contested in a distance of 30 kilometers.

Medal overview

Medalists

Medal table

References

Canoe Marathon European Championships
1995 in Spanish sport
Sport in Murcia
International sports competitions hosted by Spain
1995 in canoeing
Canoeing and kayaking competitions in Spain